Aursjoen is a lake in Skjåk Municipality in Innlandet county, Norway. The mountain Horrungen lies just east of the lake. Reinheimen National Park lies just north of the lake.

See also
List of lakes in Norway

References

Skjåk
Lakes of Innlandet